Amblypneustes pallidus is a species of sea urchin of the family Temnopleuridae. Their armour is covered with spines. It came from the genus Amblypneustes and lives in the sea. Amblypneustes pallidus was first scientifically described in 1816 by Jean-Baptiste de Lamarck.

See also 
Amblypneustes ovum
Amblypneustes elevatus
Ammotrophus arachnoides

References 

Amblypneustes
Taxa named by Jean-Baptiste Lamarck
Animals described in 1816